Cendrine Wolf (born 1969 in Colmar) is a French children's writer, known for co-writing the Oksa Pollock series with Anne Plichota. In 2012 the two announced that they would be collaborating on a new series centering on the character of Susan Hopper.

Bibliography

Oksa Pollock
L'Inespérée (2010)
La forêt des égarés (2010)
Le coeur des deux mondes (2011)
Les liens maudits (2012)
Le règne des félons (2012)

Susan Hopper
Le parfum perdu (2013)

References

External links

 
 Cedrine Wolf  bei der Verlagsgruppe Friedrich Oetinger
 Cendrine Wolf bei XO Editions (englisch)

1969 births
People from Colmar
French children's writers
Living people
French women novelists
French women children's writers
20th-century French women writers
21st-century French women writers